Isaac Keys (born June 6, 1978 in St. Louis, Missouri) is an American actor and former American and Canadian football player. He served as a National Football League linebacker for the Minnesota Vikings, Arizona Cardinals, Green Bay Packers. In 2007, he played for the Edmonton Eskimos in the Canadian Football League.

Early life
Keys attended Hazelwood Central High School in  St. Louis, Missouri, and won varsity letters in football and baseball. He is an alumnus of Morehouse College in Atlanta, Georgia.

Post-football career
In 2010, Keys appeared as one of the 12 contestants on the TV One reality television dating game show The Ultimate Merger, which stars former Apprentice contestant Omarosa.

He returned to his home town of St. Louis in 2011 to star in the hit stage play Issues of Love, written and directed by Joel P.E. King, where he played the character Tye, who had compassion for his sister Bridgette, was preyed on by a married woman and was disliked by her husband.

Since 2017, Keys has had a recurring role as Ed, a gang enforcer, on the TV series Get Shorty.

1978 births
American football outside linebackers
Arizona Cardinals players
Canadian football linebackers
Edmonton Elks players
Living people
Participants in American reality television series
Minnesota Vikings players
Morehouse Maroon Tigers football players
21st-century American male actors

In 2022, Keys debuted the character Diamond in the Starz show and 'Power' spin-off 'Power Book IV: Force'.